Peter Göransson (born 20 May 1969) is a former Swedish cross-country skier who competed from 1993 to 2003. His best World Cup finish was 12th in a sprint event in Sweden in 1997. He won Vasaloppet in 1998 with a time of 3 hours, 38 minutes and 57 seconds, beating the old Vasaloppet record by ten minutes. This record lasted for 14 years until Jörgen Brink in 2012 finished Vasaloppet 16 seconds faster (3 hours, 38 minutes and 41 seconds).

Cross-country skiing results
All results are sourced from the International Ski Federation (FIS).

World Cup

Season standings

References

External links

1969 births
Living people
Swedish male cross-country skiers
Åsarna IK skiers